Frigg is a Finnish folk music band that plays contemporary folk music, which takes its name from the goddess of Germanic mythology Frigg.

Frigg combines Nordic tradition and Americana in their music in a unique way that is described by the world music media as nordgrass which refers to the band’s bluegrass influences. Originally a Finnish-Norwegian band is nowadays purely a Finnish band but the Nordic features are still strong. Frigg is a band of seven members and the instruments include four violins, guitar, cittern, mandolin and double bass.

Frigg has performed a lot around the world for over ten years. In addition to many European countries, the tours have taken Frigg to North America, Australia, Japan and Malaysia as well as to the biggest folk music festivals such as Telluride Bluegrass Festival, Celtic Connections, Glatt und Verkehrt, WOMADelaide, Cambridge Folk Festival, Førde Festival and Rainforest World Music Festival. Frigg has gained wide audiences through television and radio when performing on A Prairie Home Companion live radio show in Minneapolis and on El Mundo program on NHK World Japan.

Frigg has released eight albums. Polka V (released in 2012) was chosen as the folk music album of the year in Finland and was nominated for a Finnish Teosto award. One of the most prominent world music magazines Songlines has picked the band’s two albums on their “Top of the world” list. Furthermore, fRoots, Sing Out! and Rhythms have mentioned the band many times in their articles and praising reviews. Frigg’s eighth album, Frost on Fiddles, was released in summer 2017.

November 2017 Frigg won Border Breaking Act of the Year Award at the first Finnish Ethnogala (awarded by Music Finland).

Discography

Albums
 Frigg (2002)
 Keidas (Oasis/Oase) (2005)
 Live (2007)
 Economy Class (2008)
 Grannen (2010)
 Polka V (2012)
 Timeline (2014)
 Frost on Fiddles (2017)
 FRIXX (2020)

References

External links
Official site

Nordic folk musical groups
Finnish musical groups